I Am Weasel is an American animated television series created for Cartoon Network by David Feiss, who directed all the episodes with the co-directions of Robin Steele and Robert Alvarez. The series follows the adventures of I.M. Weasel (voiced by Michael Dorn), a charismatic, genius, anthropomorphic weasel who is given great status in the world; and I.R. Baboon (voiced by Charlie Adler), a dimwitted, envious, and easily provoked baboon who constantly tries to outdo Weasel in his escapades.

The first four seasons were originally produced as segments featured on Feiss' other animated television series Cow and Chicken. Beginning in 1999, the segments were separated into a full series, which was joined by a fifth season. Overall the series includes 79 episodes.

Seasons

Episodes

Season 1 (1997)

Season 2 (1998)

Season 3 (1998)

Season 4 (1999)

Season 5 (1999–2000)

See also 
 List of Cow and Chicken episodes

Notes

References

External links 
 
 

Lists of American children's animated television series episodes
Lists of Cartoon Network television series episodes